Karan-Yelga (Qaranyılğa) is a rural locality (a village) in Kandrinsky Selsoviet, Tuymazinsky District, Bashkortostan, Russia. The population was 9 as of 2010. There is 1 street.

Geography 
Karan-Yelga is located 57 km east of Tuymazy (the district's administrative centre) by road. Nizhnyaya Karan-Yelga is the nearest rural locality.

References 

Rural localities in Tuymazinsky District